The Sharopoyezd (literally ball-bearing train), was a Russian attempt to develop a high-speed rail system in the 1930s. Instead of iron rails, the design specified a single rail, shaped like the bottom of the letter 'U', made of concrete.

See also 
 High-speed rail in Russia
 Shinkansen
 TGV

References

Sources 
 https://web.archive.org/web/20110719085004/http://www.rusarchives.ru/evants/exhibitions/ntd-kat/13.shtml

History of transport in Russia